is a train station in Shimizu-ku, Shizuoka City, Shizuoka Prefecture, Japan, operated by Central Japan Railway Company (JR Tōkai).

Lines
Kusanagi Station is served by the Tōkaidō Main Line, and is located 174.2 kilometers from the starting point of the line at Tokyo Station.

Station layout
The station has two opposing side platforms serving Track 1 and Track 2, with headshunts, allowing for tracks for express trains to pass in between, and a footbridge connecting the platforms. The station building has automated ticket machines, TOICA automated turnstiles and a staffed ticket office.

Platforms

Adjacent stations

|-
!colspan=5|Central Japan Railway Company

Station history
A signal box was established on the site of the present Kusanagi Station on April 10, 1911.
Kusanagi Station was opened on April 3, 1926. From 1930, the station had both passenger and freight operations; however, freight operations were discontinued from 1967. 

Station numbering was introduced to the section of the Tōkaidō Line operated JR Central in March 2018; Kusanagi Station was assigned station number CA15.

The current elevated station building dates from 2016.

Passenger statistics
In fiscal 2017, the station was used by an average of 9,191 passengers daily (boarding passengers only).

Surrounding area
Kusanagi Station serves the University of Shizuoka, Shizuoka Prefectural Museum of Art and Shizuoka Prefectural Central Library. The Shizuoka-Shimizu local railway line's via  Kusanagi Station is a three-minute walk away.

See also
 List of Railway Stations in Japan

References

Yoshikawa, Fumio. Tokaido-sen 130-nen no ayumi. Grand-Prix Publishing (2002) .

External links

Official home page

Railway stations in Japan opened in 1926
Tōkaidō Main Line
Stations of Central Japan Railway Company
Railway stations in Shizuoka (city)